The Estádio Ícaro de Castro Melo is a stadium in São Paulo, Brazil. It is located near Ibirapuera Park, beside Ginásio do Ibirapuera, which is why it is also known as Estádio do Ibirapuera. It has a capacity of 13,000 people.

In 2007, the Pan American Junior Athletics Championships were held in this venue.

References

Sports venues in São Paulo